Fred James may refer to:
 Fred J. James, American architect
 Fred James (Australian footballer) (1884–1948), Australian rules footballer
 Fred James (Canadian football) (1945–2016), Canadian rules football defensive linemen